Gladys Bernarda Casco Cruz (born 20 August 1954) is a Honduran politician. She currently serves as deputy of the National Congress of Honduras representing the National Party of Honduras for Choluteca.

References

1954 births
Living people
People from Choluteca Department
Deputies of the National Congress of Honduras
National Party of Honduras politicians
21st-century Honduran women politicians
21st-century Honduran politicians